Bornless Ones is a 2017 American supernatural horror film written and directed by Alexander Babaev. Starring Margaret Judson, Devin Goodsell, Michael Johnston and Mark Furze. The film was released on 10 February 2017.

Plot

A woman moves into a new home to provide better care for her brother, who suffers from severe cerebral palsy. They soon discover that the house holds a terrifying, deadly secret.

Cast
 Margaret Judson as Emily
 Devin Goodsell as Jesse
 Michael Johnston as Zach
 Mark Furze as Woodrow

Release
Bornless Ones released on February 10, 2017 by Uncork'd Entertainment.

References

External links
 
 

2017 films
2017 horror films
American supernatural horror films
2010s English-language films
2010s American films